

Notable missions

Mars Reconnaissance Orbiter (MRO)

New Horizons

Lunar Reconnaissance Orbiter (LRO)

Launch statistics

Rocket configurations

Launch sites

Launch outcomes

Launch history

Photo gallery

References

Atlas